Migrations is a 2006 album by The Duhks.  It is released under the Sugar Hill Records label.

Track listing
 Ol' Cook Pot (Shawn Byrne / Chuck McCarthy)
 Mountains o' Things (Tracy Chapman)
 Heaven's My Home (Ruby Amanfu/Katie Herzig)
 The Fox and the Bee (Tania Elizabith; Jordan McConnell; traditional arr. The Duhks)
 Down to the River / Jeb's Tune -  (Keith Frank [words by Leonard Podolak]; Jeb Puryear)
 Who Will Take My Place? (Dan Frechette)
 Moses Don't Get Lost (Traditional arr. The Duhks; words by Tim O'Brien)
 Three Fishers (Public Domain arr. The Duhks)
 Domino Party! — Laine's Jig / Close To The Floor / The Domino Party / The Musical Party (Leonard Podolak; Tania Elizabeth)
 Out of the Rain (Jessee Havey)
 Turtle Dove (Traditional arr. The Duhks)

Production
 Co-produced by Tim O'Bryen and Gary Paczosa
 Recorded by Gary Paczosa at Omni Studios and Minutia
 Mixed by Gary Paczosa at Minutia
 Assistant Engineers: Brandon Bell and Bob Ingison
 Mastered by Doug Sax and Robert Hadley, The Mastering Lab, Hollywood, CA

Personnel
 Tania Elizabeth - fiddle, harmony vocals
 Jessee Havey - lead vocals, harmony vocals
 Jordan McConnell - guitar, harmony vocals
 Leonard Podolak - claw-hammer banjo, lead vocals (Down to the River)
 Scott Senior - pandeiro, cajob, congas, bongo, surdo, djembe, shakers, bells, cymbals, pots and pans
Guests
 Tim O'Brien - bouzouki, harmony vocals, electric guitar, mandolin
 Katie Herzig - harmony vocals
 Luke Bulla - harmony vocals

References
 

The Duhks albums
2006 albums
Sugar Hill Records albums